Heterodera delvii  (cereal cyst nematode) is a plant pathogenic nematode, who is cited as an invasive species.

Notes

References 
 Jairajpur, M. Shamim; Khan, VC'ajih U.; Setty, K. G. H.; Govindu, H. C.  Heterodera delvii n. sp. (Nematoda: Heteroderidae), a parasite of ragi (Eleusine coracana) in Bangalore, India. Revue de Nématologie 2(1) 1979:3-9.

delvii
Plant pathogenic nematodes
Nematodes described in 1979